The Church of St Mary is a 13th-century church in the grounds of the Orchardleigh Estate in Somerset, England.

History
The church stands on an island in the  artificial Orchardleigh Lake in the grounds of the Orchardleigh Estate within the parish of Lullington, Somerset. It was built in the 13th century, and was heavily restored by Sir George Gilbert Scott for the Rev. W. A. Duckworth in 1878, whose relations held the estate at that period. It has since been designated a Grade I listed building.

The church has retained its sculptures and stained glass from the 14th and 15th centuries respectively. Around 1800, estate owner Thomas Champneys of the Mostyn-Champneys Baronets had a moat dug around the church.

Memorials
The church has the grave of the poet Henry Newbolt and his wife, a member of the Duckworth family.

Present day
Weddings are often performed at the church, which has capacity for 120 guests. It is reached from the mainland via a footbridge, and a public footpath runs nearby over another bridge across the lake. The church does not have an electricity supply and therefore services are candlelit. The organ is pumped by hand.

The Anglican parish is part of the benefice of Beckington with Standerwick, Berkley, Rodden and Orchardleigh within the Frome deanery.

See also
 Grade I listed buildings in Mendip
 List of Somerset towers
 List of ecclesiastical parishes in the Diocese of Bath and Wells

References

13th-century church buildings in England
Grade I listed churches in Somerset
Church of England church buildings in Mendip District
Grade I listed buildings in Mendip District